Jake Allston (born 1986) is an American sound designer.

Career 
Allston was born in Glens Falls, New York and started his professional career designing sound effects for animated television shows at Advantage Audio in 2006. Soon thereafter, he also edited audio for reality television at Max Post (Original Productions) in 2008 on various series including Deadliest Catch and Ice Road Truckers. 

On August 30, 2009, Jake received an Emmy Award for his contributions as supervising sound editor on Nickelodeon's Tak and the Power of Juju. According to a representative of the National Academy of Television Arts and Sciences in New York, "Allston's achievement at such a young age is remarkable."

He began teaching Advanced Audio Post-Production at the Los Angeles Film School in 2015. 

In 2017, Jake became senior cinematic sound designer for Sony PlayStation. His credits include God of War, Spider-Man, and Death Stranding. From 2018-2020, the accolades were substantial for the PS4 titles at various award ceremonies including the D.I.C.E. Awards, BAFTA Game Awards, NAVGTR Awards, and MPSE Awards.

Filmography

Awards and nominations

Daytime Emmy Awards 
2009 - Outstanding Achievement in Sound Editing – Live Action or Animation - 
Nickelodeon's Tak and the Power of Juju (won)

MPSE Golden Reel Awards 
2020 - Motion Picture Sound Editors#Golden Reel Awards Outstanding Achievement in Sound Editing – Computer Cinematic - Death Stranding (nominated)
2020 - Outstanding Achievement in Sound Editing – Computer Interactive Game Play - Death Stranding (nominated)
2019 - Outstanding Achievement in Sound Editing – Computer Cinematic - God of War (nominated)
2019 - Outstanding Achievement in Sound Editing – Computer Interactive Game Play - God of War (won)
2019 - Outstanding Achievement in Sound Editing – Computer Cinematic - Spider-Man (nominated)
2019 - Outstanding Achievement in Sound Editing – Computer Interactive Game Play - Spider-Man (nominated)
2011 - Best Sound Editing: Television Animation - G.I. Joe: Renegades (Nominated)
2008 - Best Sound Editing: Television Animation - Tak and the Power of Juju (nominated)

BAFTA Games Awards 
2020 - British Academy Games Awards Audio Achievement - Death Stranding (Nominated)
2019 - Audio Achievement - God of War (won)
2019 - Audio Achievement - Spider-Man (Nominated)

D.I.C.E. Awards 
2020 D.I.C.E. Awards Outstanding Achievement in Sound Design - Death Stranding (won)
2019 - Outstanding Achievement in Sound Design - God of War (won)
2019 - Outstanding Achievement in Sound Design - Spider-Man (Nominated)

Golden Joystick Awards 
2018 - Golden Joystick Awards Best Audio - God of War (won)

NAVGTR Awards 
2020 - Sound Editing in a Game Cinema - Death Stranding (won)
2020 - Sound Effects - Death Stranding (nominated)
2020 - Use of Sound, Franchise - Death Stranding (nominated)
2019 - Sound Editing in a Game Cinema - God of War (won)
2019 - Sound Editing in a Game Cinema - Spider-Man (Nominated)
2019 - Sound Effects - God of War (won)
2019 - Sound Effects - Spider-Man (nominated)
2019 - Use of Sound, Franchise - God of War (won)

The Game Awards 
2019 - The Game Awards Best Audio - Death Stranding (nominated)
2018 - Best Audio - God of War (nominated)
2018 - Best Audio - Spider-Man (nominated)

References

External links 
 
 Jake Allston Official Website

1986 births
Living people
American audio engineers
Emmy Award winners
American sound designers
American sound editors